Indian languages may refer to:
 Languages of India
 Languages of the Indian subcontinent, more broadly, i.e., South Asia
 Languages of the American Indians
 Languages of Australian Aboriginals

See also 
 Indo-Aryan languages, a group of languages predominantly spoken in Northern India
 Indo-European languages, a big language family